Mekko is a 2015 American drama film directed by Sterlin Harjo.  Harjo's third feature film, it is a thriller set among a community of homeless Native Americans in Tulsa.

Plot
Mekko leaves prison, having served a long sentence for having killed his cousin in a brawl. He reflects on his family's knowing and the path that he strayed from, where he was considered a see'r by the old people. He is haunted by visions of his own death and his ultimate fight with an evil spirit witch that takes the form of warriors or animal spirits. He knows he must confront it, but he fears his own weakness. Mekko meets a fellow native american who says he is a warrior, but who actually preys on the weak while demanding respect. Mekko looks into the man's heart and sees that it is the dwelling place of a witch who has killed many times. Inevitably, a confrontation arises. Mekko tries to avoid it, but he knows that the witch is hunting him.

The title word 'mekko' means head person or 'town king' in the Muskogee language, native to the independent tribal towns of 18th-century Tennessee-Georgia-Alabama area of the Southeast USA.

Cast
 Rod Rondeaux as Mekko
 Jamie Loy as Rita
 Scott Mason as Matt
 Zahn McClarnon as Bill
 Sarah Podemski as Tafv

Production
On this production, Harjo was inspired by Werner Herzog's 1977 film Stroszek  to aim for a heightened degree of naturalism, using many real locations and real people, rather than professional actors.  He found many of his cast members among people he met at the Iron Gate soup kitchen in downtown Tulsa, and he also hired locals for nearly all of his crew, saying that he wanted his crew to be familiar with Tulsa and with Native Americans.

Release
Mekko premiered at the Los Angeles Film Festival in June 2015. It was screened in the Contemporary World Cinema section of the 2015 Toronto International Film Festival; the imagineNATIVE Film + Media Arts Festival, where it was named best feature film; the Santa Fe Independent Film Festival, where it was named best narrative feature; and at the 2015 American Indian Film Festival, where it won the best film award as well as acting awards for stars Rod Rondeaux, Zahn McClarnon, and Sarah Podemski.

Reviews
Variety critic Dennis Harvey complimented Rod Rondeaux's "soulful performance" in the title role, and compared the film to two classic films set on skid row, On the Bowery (1956) and The Exiles (1961).

References

External links
 

2015 films
2015 drama films
American drama films
Films about Native Americans
Films set in Tulsa, Oklahoma
2010s English-language films
2010s American films